Los Ojos llenos de amor is a 1954 Argentine film.

Cast

 Ángel Magaña as Anibal Ferrán
 Malisa Zini
 Alicia Bellán

External links
 

1954 films
1950s Spanish-language films
Argentine black-and-white films
Argentine romantic comedy films
1954 romantic comedy films
1950s Argentine films